Depressaria emeritella is a moth of the family Depressariidae. It is found in most of Europe. It is also found in the Near East and the eastern part of the Palearctic realm.

The wingspan is 22–26 mm. Adults are on wing from July to August and then hibernating until the following spring. There is one generation per year.

The larvae feed on Tanacetum vulgare. They live in rolled leaves of their host plant. Pupation takes place in a cocoon in the earth.

References

Moths described in 1849
Depressaria
Moths of Europe
Moths of Asia